Nikita van der Vliet (born 14 March 2000) is a Dutch handball player for Nykøbing Falster Håndboldklub and the Dutch national team. (28-September-2018; NED-JAP)

She represented the Netherlands at the 2020 European Women's Handball Championship.

In September 2018, she was included by EHF in a list of the twenty best young handballers to watch for the future.

Individual awards  
 Youth World Championship Top Scorer: 2018
 All-Star Line Player of the Youth World Championship: 2018

References

External links

2000 births
Living people
Dutch female handball players
People from Purmerend
Expatriate handball players
Dutch expatriate sportspeople in Denmark
Nykøbing Falster Håndboldklub players
Sportspeople from North Holland
21st-century Dutch women